Domeikavos Gimnazija is a school located in Domeikava, Kaunas, Lithuania. It was founded in the early 1920s.

External links
Official web site

Schools in Kaunas
Secondary schools in Lithuania
Gymnasiums in Lithuania